Dulwich Prep London (DPL), formerly known as Dulwich College Preparatory School, is an independent preparatory school in Dulwich, south London, England for boys aged 3–13 years, with a co-educational Nursery. The current Head Master is Louise Davidson.

In 1938 headmaster John Leakey established an evacuation camp in the orchard on his father-in-law's land at Coursehorn, near Cranbrook, Kent, where the affiliated Dulwich Prep Cranbrook still is today.

The school changed its name in September 2011 to Dulwich Prep London, having been previously called Dulwich College Preparatory School. Despite their close proximity and relationship, the school has no official link with Dulwich College, which has its own junior school for students between ages 7 and 13.

Notable former pupils

The following people were educated at the school:

 Nigel Baker (1980), Ambassador to the Vatican
 Mark Garnier (1976), MP for Wyre Forest
 Sir Desmond de Silva QC (1951), Chairman of a UNHCR Inquiry into torture and executions of detainees in Syria
 Jonathan Head (1974), BBC South East Asia Correspondent
 Paul Sinha (1983), Chaser on The Chase
 Charles Haviland (1977) - BBC Editor and Correspondent for SE Asia, reporting on Sri Lanka, Nepal, Afghanistan, India and Pakistan
 Robert Hall (1967) - Special Correspondent for the BBC
 John Simpson (1957) - BBC world affairs correspondent
 Rory Cellan-Jones (1967) -  BBC technology correspondent covering the internet and new media
 Sir Peter Bazalgette  (1953) - Chairman of ITV
 Hugh Bonneville (1977) - Actor best known for playing Robert Crawley in the ITV period drama series Downton Abbey from 2010 until 2015
 Chiwetel Ejiofor (1990) - Actor best known for playing Solomon Northup in 12 Years a Slave, for which he received Academy Award and Golden Globe nominations, along with the BAFTA Award for Best Actor
 Martin Jarvis (1953) - Actor and voice actor
 Bob Monkhouse (1936) - Entertainer
 Ian Bostridge (1978) - Tenor
 Matthew Knight (1999) - Royal Philharmonic Orchestra
 Derek Underwood, England cricketer
 Donald Swann (the pianist half of Flanders & Swann)
 Rory Hamilton-Brown, Sussex Cricketer
 Jacob Shaw, Musician
 Daniel Bell-Drummond, Kent Cricketer, England U19s
 Nick Easter (1991) - England and Harlequins Rugby player
 Mark Easter (1996) - Sale Sharks Rugby Player
 Roger Knight (1960) - President of the MCC
 Victor Mishcon, Baron Mishcon - Founder of Mishcon De Reya LLP and Labour politician
 Adam Shaheen (1969) - Writer/ Producer - Cuppa Coffee Studios
 Neville Keighley (1969) - Singer/songwriter who uses the stage name Belouis Some

References

External links
 School website
 George Marsh, head teacher of Dulwich College Preparatory School, BBC News, 26 September 2000
 History of Dulwich College Preparatory School in Cranbrook, Kent

1885 establishments in England
Dulwich
Preparatory School
Educational institutions established in 1885
Private boys' schools in London
Private schools in the London Borough of Southwark
Preparatory schools in London